Plogging is a combination of jogging with picking up litter (merging the Swedish verbs  (pick up) and  (jog) gives the new Swedish verb , from which the word plogging derives). It started as an organized activity in Sweden around 2016 and spread to other countries in 2018, following increased concern about plastic pollution. As a workout, it provides variation in body movements by adding bending, squatting and stretching to the main action of running, hiking, or walking. An estimated 2,000,000 people plog daily in 100 countries and some plogging events have attracted over 3,000,000 participants.

Examples and initiatives
Erik Ahlström started plogging in the Swedish capital city, Stockholm, when he moved there from the Åre ski resort. He created the website Plogga to organise the activity and encourage volunteers.

In Alicante, Spain, plogging came with the name Plogging RRevolution with the aim of spreading the movement throughout the country to promote sports and environmental care.

Author David Sedaris combines litter picking with exercise in the Parham, Coldwaltham and Storrington districts of West Sussex, taking up to 60,000 steps a day in pursuit of local rubbish. He was so effective in keeping his neighbourhood clean that the local authority named a waste vehicle in his honour. The Lord Lieutenant of West Sussex, Susan Pyper, said "The sign on this truck is a very fitting way to say a huge 'thank you' to David for his tireless efforts ... he is a real local hero."

The Keep America Beautiful organisation is now promoting plogging to its affiliates and has found that some already combined exercise with clean up, such as the Trashercize program in Tennessee. In New York, a Meetup group, Plogging NYC, had about 100 members in 2018, with events in four boroughs. In Indianapolis in 2018, a Summer of Plogging was organised by the November Project and the local affiliate of Keep America Beautiful.

National Cleanup Day advocates plogging as a way to clean up and keep the outdoors clean and maintains the website Plogging.org in support of organizations holding plogging events.

There is a group in Oakland, California, called Fit4Good that aims to pick up trash around Lake Merritt each week.

Ripu Daman Bevli, introduced the concept of plogging in India and he is known as the Plogman of India. He commenced Litter Free India movement, which combines Swachh Bharat and FIT India missions. Till March 2021, Bevli has organized more than 500 cleanups across 80 cities under the Litter Free India movement, which has seen a participation of close to 1 crore (10 million) people. The Indian Prime Minister, Narendra Modi, has plogged to lead by example for his Swachh Bharat Mission to clean up India.

Pune Ploggers founded by Vivek Gurav is the largest community of ploggers in a single city with more than 500 routine ploggers throughout Pune, and has collected more than 40,000 kilograms of plastic. In December 2019 the organization coordinated the largest plogging drive, with 105,000 people involved who collected 19,000 kilograms of trash in one hour.

A non-profit initiative called Go Plog! has collected 16 tonnes of dry waste in Kolar through plogging. They organise an event every month. Students to high-ranking officials of the local administration participate.

Benefits
A scientific study from 2022 found that plogging and jogging are comparable in terms of energy expenditure, but that the proportion of energy coming from fat is significantly higher in plogging . Picking up litter through full squat and lunge movements was found to be ergonomically favourable over semi-squat and stoop movements. The study suggests that plogging strengthens the muscles of the lower body and that it involves a larger proportion of the human body’s muscle groups than does jogging. The study advises against semi-squat and stoop movements and advocates that the litter bag be occasionally swapped between the plogger’s hands to avoid a lengthy one-sided load distribution for the plogger.

See also
Clean-up (environment)
Earth Day
Keep America Beautiful
National CleanUp Day
Outdoor Recreation
Ripu Daman Bevli

Gallery

External links
 Plogging Website
 Plogging TikTok Site
 Plogging Instagram Site

References

Litter
Physical exercise
Environmental volunteering
Plastics and the environment
Waste collection
Individual forms of volunteering